"Weirdmageddon 3: Take Back The Falls" is the series finale of the American animated television series Gravity Falls, created by Alex Hirsch. The episode was written by Shion Takeuchi, Mark Rizzo, Josh Weinstein, Jeff Rowe, and Hirsch, and directed by Stephen Sandoval. The series follows twelve-year-old twins Dipper (voiced by Jason Ritter) and Mabel Pines (voiced by Kristen Schaal), who stay for the summer with their great uncle Grunkle Stan (voiced by Hirsch) in a tourist trap called the Mystery Shack, set within the fictional town of Gravity Falls, Oregon. In this episode, Stan's brother Ford (voiced by J. K. Simmons) discovers the extent of Bill Cipher's plans, while the Mystery Shack crew forms a plan to fight back and reclaim the town. A final confrontation with Bill leads to the Pines family's ultimate fate and greatest sacrifice.

"Weirdmageddon 3: Take Back The Falls" was first broadcast on February 15, 2016, on Disney XD, and was watched by 2.47 million households in the United States. It became the most watched telecast in the history of Disney XD, beating "A Tale of Two Stans", another episode of Gravity Falls.

Plot
Dipper, Mabel, Soos, and Wendy return to the Mystery Shack to find Stan, a handful of town residents, and several of the paranormal creatures they have befriended and met taking shelter there. After escaping from one of Bill's eye bats, Stan tells the gang that the unicorn hair Ford lined the base of the Shack with protects them from Bill's powers. Stan believes they should wait it out, but the others agree to mount a rescue mission after discovering that the townsfolk are being petrified by the eye bats and stacked into a makeshift throne for Bill. Old Man McGucket leads the survivors into turning the Shack into a giant mech. They travel to Bill's base of operations and readily defeat his minions. Bill himself comes out to fight, but his eye is torn out of its socket by the mech, blinding him temporarily.

Dipper and Mabel lead a small group aboard Bill's base. They disassemble Bill's throne, restoring the petrified citizens. Ford spray-paints a Zodiac wheel on the ground, having seen the image described as a means to defeat Bill. The wheel requires ten specific people, indicated by symbols on it that Ford only recently had deduced the meaning of, to stand on it and hold hands in a ring. Stan refuses to join until Ford both apologizes for inadvertently allowing Bill to accomplish his goal and thanks him for rescuing him. Ford reluctantly does so, but as Stan joins the wheel, Ford corrects Stan's grammar under his breath, and Stan and Ford get into a fight. Before they can be broken up, Bill appears, having regenerated his eye and destroyed the mech.

Bill burns the Zodiac, secures the Pines family, and turns the others into tapestries to keep them from interfering. Bill threatens to kill Dipper and Mabel unless Ford allows him into his mind to find out how to escape Gravity Falls. Dipper and Mabel manage to escape, with Bill in pursuit. Left alone, Stan and Ford reconcile and have a heart-to-heart talk due to Stan being devastated about Dipper and Mabel's potential doom as a result of his grudge against Ford and Ford being remorseful about making a deal with Bill in the first place. Although there is a way to defeat Bill by erasing him from someone's mind using the memory gun, Ford believes the only way to save the kids is to allow Bill into his mind, though his own memories cannot be erased because of a metal plate in his head. This gives Stan an idea.

Dipper and Mabel lead Bill in a chase around his base but are eventually caught. Bill returns them to the throne room and threatens to kill one of them. Just as Bill is about to kill Mabel, Ford reluctantly agrees to allow Bill into his mind. Bill leaves his physical body, which petrifies, and enters Ford's mindscape, appearing as an empty void with a single door. Bill enters the door and is shocked and horrified to find himself greeted by Stan's mindscape self, who reveals that he and Ford swapped places to trick Bill into making a deal with the wrong twin and entering a mind susceptible to the memory gun's effects, and expresses his willingness to sacrifice his memories to save the world and his family. Stan declares Bill unworthy of any mercy due to Bill endangering his family and the rest of the world with Weirdmageddon. In the real world, Ford reluctantly fires the memory gun at Stan to completely erase Stan's memories. A terrified Bill starts to weaken and is then punched by Stan's mindscape self, destroying him as the rest of Stan's mindscape is erased by the memory gun's effects. Following Bill's demise, the gateway to his dimension begins to close, drawing in his minions and base. Once closed, the town is reverted to its pre-Weirdmageddon state. Stan's family and Soos take him back to the nearly-destroyed Mystery Shack, hoping the sight of the building will help bring back his memories. Mabel finds her scrapbook and shows Stan all the fun they had over the summer, slowly bringing back Stan's memories.

Over the next week, the townsfolk deal with remaining supernatural phenomena as the mayor passes the "Never Mind All That Act" to ease their worries; the Northwest family goes broke and loses their mansion, prompting McGucket to move in; and Gideon Gleeful promises to behave more like a normal citizen, though his fellow inmates still hurt those who make fun of him. Many of the townsfolk join with Dipper and Mabel's friends to celebrate the twins' 13th birthday at the Shack. Ford offers to sail around the world for a year with Stan, a dream they had together as boys, but Stan states that he would have to close the Shack, which disappoints the townspeople since it draws tourists to their town. Stan then happily names Soos the new manager of the Shack.

Later, Stan, Ford, Soos, Wendy, Candy and Grenda all see off Dipper and Mabel as their bus for home pulls up. Wendy trades hats with Dipper and gives him an envelope to open on the ride home. The bus pulls away as the group waves goodbye. As the twins think back on their time in Gravity Falls, flash-forwards show Soos successfully running the Shack with his girlfriend Melody, as well as Stan and Ford's voyage at sea. When the bus passes the town's limits, Dipper opens Wendy's letter to find their friends' and great uncles' signatures, promising to "see you next summer".

The end credits segment features a montage of the twins' summer and their eventual arrival in Piedmont, California. In a post-credits scene, a real-life statue of Bill's petrified physical body is seen partially submerged in the ground in the woods for just over a second.

Production

"Weirdmageddon 3: Take Back The Falls" is the twentieth episode of the second season and the final episode of Gravity Falls, created by Alex Hirsch. He wrote it with Mark Rizzo, Jeff Rowe, Shion Takeuchi, and Josh Weinstein. It is the fifth episode to be directed by Stephen Sandoval.

On November 20, 2015, before the final two "Weirdmageddon" episodes aired on Disney XD, Hirsch announced on his Tumblr account that he decided to end Gravity Falls. He explained that Disney wasn't cancelling the show, but instead being finished by his own choice, and that it was a decision made months in advance. Hirsch went on to explain that he did not want Gravity Falls to lose its original spark, and he never meant the show to be a series that goes on forever, but an exploration of the experience of summer and a story about childhood itself. According to Hirsch, the fact that childhood ends is exactly what makes the show so precious – and why the viewers should cherish it while it lasts.

The episode features a number of guest stars who had already appeared on the show once or twice, such as Cecil Baldwin as Tad Strange, Kurt Braunohler as Greg Valentino, Louis C.K. as The Horrifying Sweaty One-Armed Monstrosity (a role that has since been redubbed by Hirsch), Nathan Fillion as Preston Northwest, Danielle Fishel as Pyronica, Larry King as a wax version of his disembodied head, Andy Merrill as Teeth, Alfred Molina as the Multi-Bear, and J.K. Simmons taking the recurring role as Ford Pines. There is only one new character in the finale: the bus driver who takes Dipper and Mabel back to Piedmont, California, voiced by Twin Peaks star Kyle MacLachlan.

Broadcast
The episode premiered on Disney XD on February 15, 2016, at 7:00pm EST. On its premiere day, the episode garnered an average of 2.47 million viewers across the United States, beating "A Tale of Two Stans" as the most watched telecast in the history of the network.

On February 8, 2016, seven days before the premiere, Disney XD aired a half-hour special titled Gravity Falls: Between the Pines, hosted by creator Alex Hirsch and Gravity Falls character Time Baby (played by Dave Wittenberg). The special elaborates on the production of the show, giving fans an inside look behind the scenes. A 68-hour marathon aired on Disney XD from February 12, 2016, up until the finale on February 15, 2016, with the entire series airing in order. Because there were only 39 episodes, the show was looped four times to fill the 68-hour slot.

Reception
The finale received critical acclaim from both critics and fans of the show alike. Alasdair Wilkins of The A.V. Club claimed that it was the perfect ending to the series and awarded the episode an "A" for bringing back as many characters as possible, with even tertiary supporting characters getting their own little moment to shine. He applauded the way the episode exemplifies all Gravity Falls could be at its frequent best: it's funny, emotional, beautiful and terrifying in equal measure. According to him, "[B]ack when Gravity Falls started out, it was pitched as a kid-friendly cross of The Simpsons, Twin Peaks, and The X-Files. I can think of no finer final tribute than to say it lived up to all the ridiculous potential implicit in that description … and ended up being something even better than that." In the end, he wrote that Gravity Falls had kicked off his A.V. Club reviewing career nearly four years earlier and was likely to be the only show he would ever get to review wire-to-wire, and so would always have a very special place in his heart for reasons that he couldn't imagine anyone else caring all that much about.

Max Nicholson of IGN gave the episode a 9/10, praising its way of balancing all the characters and not leaving anybody out of the fun. He also enjoyed the little nods to the previous episodes of the show. According to him, "Weirdmageddon 3" was filled with laughs, excitement and heartwarming moments. In his review, "As animated series go, Gravity Falls was an excellent one, and it'll be sad to see it go. At the same time, I'm glad it ended while it was still fresh, so fans can remember it fondly".

The episode gained considerable press after its revelation that the characters Sheriff Blubs and Deputy Durland are gay, with coverage in LGBT-oriented sites as well. The pairing was revealed after the pair threatens anyone who asked too many questions about the events of Weirdmageddon with tasers. When saying they would zap them if anyone tells what happened, Deputy Durland says that they're "mad with power", then turns to Sheriff Blubs as they add "...and love". Hirsch previously said that he believed that he would be blocked from including LGBT characters in the show. He said: "I would love to, but I doubt they'd ever let me do it in kids' TV. But man, I would if I could". This was the first time Disney XD and Disney Channel introduced a gay male couple, described as "Disney taking a huge step towards equality".

Notes

References

2016 American television episodes
Gravity Falls episodes
LGBT-related animated television episodes
American television series finales
American LGBT-related television episodes
2016 in LGBT history